The School of Business and Management is the business school of The Hong Kong University of Science and Technology (HKUST), today considered one of the world's leading business schools in Asia. 
Established in 1991 in Hong Kong, it offers undergraduate degrees, full-time MBA, EMBA in partnership with Kellogg School of Management, MSc, PhD, and Executive Education programs. HKUST Business School is also one of the first Asian business schools accredited by both the US-based Association to Advance Collegiate Schools of Business (AACSB International) and the European Quality Improvement System (EQUIS).

The Business School is well recognized for focusing on new technologies, thanks to a large variety of study tracks and proximity with the Nanshan District of Shenzhen.

It has six academic departments: Accounting, Economics, Finance, Marketing, Management, and Information System, Business Statistics, and Operations Management (ISOM).

Academic programs

Undergraduate
 BBA (Economics, Finance, General Business Management, Global Business, Information System, Management, Marketing, Operations Management, Professional Accounting)
 BSc (Economics and Finance, Quantitative Finance)
 Joint School/Interdisciplinary Programs – BSc (Biotechnology and Business, Mathematics and Economics, Environmental Management and Technology, Individualized Interdisciplinary Major, Rick Management and Business Intelligence)
 Dual Degree Program – Technology and Management (5 years)
 World Bachelor in Business, in collaboration with the University of Southern California and Bocconi University

Master of Business Administration (MBA)
 Full-time MBA
 MBA for Professionals (Part-time)
 MBA for Professionals (Bi-Weekly Part-time)
 Digital MBA (DiMBA)

Executive MBA
 EMBA for Chinese Executives
 Kellogg-HKUST Executive MBA
 HKUST-SKOLKOVO Executive MBA for Eurasia

Master of Science 
 HKUST-NYU Stern MS in Global Finance
 MSc in Accounting
 MSc in Business Analytics
 MSc in Economics
 MSc in Finance
 MSc in Financial Technology
 MSc in Global Operations (HKUST-Yale Double Degree Option)
 MSc in Information Systems Management
 MSc in International Management (CEMS - The Global Alliance in Management Education) (HKUST-Yale & HEC-HKUST Double Degree Options)
 MSc in Investment Management

PhD/ MPhil
Field of study: Accounting, Economics, Finance, Information Systems, Operations Management, Management and Marketing

Non-degree Executive Programs

 Open programs
 Company programs

Rankings

Kellogg-HKUST Executive MBA Program by Financial Times
Ranking No.1 in the world (2007, 2009–2013, 2016–2018)

Full-time MBA Program by Financial Times
Ranking No.1 in Hong Kong (2010-2019)

Partnership programs
Over 130 and 80 partner organizations for undergraduate and postgraduate programs respectively, including leading business schools in Asia, Australasia, Europe and North America.
Member of the prestigious CEMS network which includes 34 of the world's best business schools 
 HKUST-NYU Stern MS in Global Finance with Leonard N. Stern School of Business, New York University
 World Bachelor in Business with University of Southern California and Bocconi University
 HKUST-SKOLKOVO Executive MBA for Eurasia with Moscow School of Management SKOLKOVO

Academic departments
 Accounting
 Economics
 Finance
 Information System, Business Statistics and Operations Management (ISOM)
 Marketing
 Management

Campuses
 HKUST Campus
 Lee Shau Kee Campus
 HKUST Business School Central
 HKUST Business School Beijing

Research & Education Centers
 Center for Business Strategy and Innovation
 Center for Economic Development
 Center for Marketing and Supply Chain Management
 Tanoto Center for Asian Family Business and Entrepreneurship Studies
 Thompson Center for Business Case Studies
 Tongyi Industrial Group Center for E-Commerce
 Center for Investing
 Center for Business Education
Center for Business Strategy and Innovation

References

External links
 HKUST
 HKUST Business School

Business schools in Hong Kong
Hong Kong University of Science and Technology
1991 establishments in Hong Kong